Triebel is a municipality in the Vogtlandkreis district, in Saxony, Germany, situated south of the town of Plauen.

Fotographs

References 

Municipalities in Saxony
Vogtlandkreis